The China seismic intensity scale (CSIS) is a national standard in the People's Republic of China used to measure seismic intensity.  Similar to EMS-92 on which CSIS drew reference, seismic impacts are classified into 12 degrees of intensity, or liedu (literally "degrees of violence") in Roman numerals from I for insensible to XII for landscape reshaping.

The scale was initially formalized by the China Earthquake Administration (CEA) in 1980, therefore often referred to by its original title as "China Seismic Intensity Scale (1980)".  It was later revised, and adopted as a national standard, or Guobiao, series GB/T 17742-1999 by then National Quality and Technology Supervision Administration (now General Administration of Quality Supervision, Inspection, and Quarantine of P.R.C., AQSIQ) in 1999.
The standard was set for revision not long before the 2008 Sichuan earthquake.

Liedu scale
Unlike the magnitude scales that objectively estimate the released seismic energy, liedu denotes how strongly an earthquake affects a specific place.  It is determined by a combination of subjective evaluations (such as human senses and building damages) and objective kinetic measures.  Building damages are further refined with a combination of descriptive qualifiers and a numeric evaluation process.

The following is an unofficial translation of the Appendix I of GB/T 17742-1999.

Notes about qualifiers: "very few" - <10%; "few" - 10% - 50%; "most" - 50% - 70%; "majority" - 70% - 90%; "commonly" - >90%.

Applications
Historic local seismic liedu is an important reference in quake proofing existing and future buildings.  The national standard Code for Seismic Design of Buildings (GB 500011-2001) published in 2001 and partially revised shortly after the 2008 Sichuan earthquake includes a list of liedu that each building in designated cities is expected to resist.

See also
 Seismic intensity scales
 Seismic magnitude scales
 Seismic engineering

Notes and references

External links

Seismic intensity scales
Guobiao standards
Earthquake engineering
Science and technology in China
1999 introductions